Niaqurnaaluk (Inuktitut syllabics: ᓂᐊᖁᕐᓈᓗᒃ formerly Cape Eglinton (sometimes written as Nahanausaq) is a land point on eastern Baffin Island, in the Qikiqtaaluk Region, Nunavut, Canada. It was previously named by Sir John Ross in honour of the Earl of Eglinton.

References

Peninsulas of Qikiqtaaluk Region